Natalia Mędrzyk (born Natalia Kurnikowska 13 January 1992 in Gdańsk) is a Polish volleyball player.

She plays for the Polish national team.
She participated at the 2017 Women's European Volleyball Championship, and the 2017 FIVB Volleyball World Grand Prix.

References 

1992 births
Polish women's volleyball players
Living people
Sportspeople from Gdańsk
Volleyball players at the 2015 European Games
European Games silver medalists for Poland
European Games medalists in volleyball
21st-century Polish women